Dennis van Scheppingen (born 5 July 1975) is a Dutch former professional tennis player. Turning pro in 1993, right-hander van Scheppingen reached his highest individual ranking on the ATP Tour on 13 September 2004, when he became world No. 72.

Performance timeline

Singles

ATP career finals

Doubles: 1 (1 runner-up)

ATP Challenger and ITF Futures finals

Singles: 20 (13–7)

Doubles: 7 (3–4)

References

External links
 
 
 

1975 births
Living people
Dutch male tennis players
People from De Ronde Venen
Sportspeople from Utrecht (province)